Jimmy Roberto Blandón Quiñónez (born January 1, 1969 in Esmeraldas) is a former Ecuadorian football midfielder. He played in 30 matches for Ecuador between 1997 and 2000. He was a strong defensive midfielder with great mobility and tireless physical condition.

Blandón has played club football in  Ecuador for Barcelona SC, Emelec and Deportivo Cuenca, in Colombia for Millonarios, as well as for Bolivian side Blooming.

Honours

Club
 Blooming
 Liga de Fútbol Profesional Boliviano: 1999
 Deportivo Cuenca
 Serie A de Ecuador: 2004

Nation
 Ecuador
 Canada Cup: 1999

References

External links

1969 births
Living people
Sportspeople from Esmeraldas, Ecuador
Association football midfielders
Ecuadorian footballers
Ecuador international footballers
C.D. Cuenca footballers
Millonarios F.C. players
Club Blooming players
Barcelona S.C. footballers
C.D. ESPOLI footballers
C.S. Emelec footballers
Ecuadorian Serie A players
Categoría Primera A players
Bolivian Primera División players
Expatriate footballers in Bolivia
Expatriate footballers in Colombia
1999 Copa América players
Ecuadorian expatriates in Colombia
9 de Octubre F.C. managers